The Nokia 9000 Communicator was the first product in Nokia's Communicator series, announced at CeBIT 1996 and introduced into the market on 15 August 1996. The phone was large and heavy at  but powerful at the time. It is powered by an Intel 24 MHz i386 CPU and has 8 MB of memory, which is divided between applications (4 MB), program memory (2 MB) and user data (2 MB). The operating system is PEN/GEOS 3.0. The Communicator is one of the earliest smartphones on the market, after the IBM Simon in 1994 and the HP OmniGo 700LX, a DOS-based palmtop PC with integrated cradle for the Nokia 2110 cellular mobile phone, announced in late 1995 and shipped in March 1996.

The Communicator was highly advanced, featuring sending and receiving e-mail and fax via its 9.6 kbit/s GSM modem, and it also had a web browser and business programs. It is formed of a clamshell design that opens up to reveal a monochrome LCD display with a 640 × 200 resolution and a full QWERTY keyboard similar to a Psion PDA. It was priced £1,000 in the UK upon launch. Then-CEO of Nokia, Jorma Ollila, said in 2012 regarding the device: "We were five years ahead."

9110 

The Nokia 9110 Communicator is the updated model of the Nokia 9000 Communicator in the Communicator series.
Its biggest change from the 9000 is that it weighs much less.

Specifications 
 Operating system: GEOS (running on top of ROM-DOS) on the PDA side
 Main applications: Fax, short messages, email, Wireless imaging: digital camera connectivity, Smart messaging, TextWeb, Web browser, Serial Terminal, Telnet, Contacts, Notes, Calendar, Calculator, world time clock, Composer. 
 Display: 640 × 200 Pixels
 Size: 158 mm × 56 mm × 27 mm
 Weight: 253 g
 Processor: Embedded AMD Élan SC450 Am486 processor at 33 MHz
 Memory: 8 MB total, 4 MB Operating System and applications, 2 MB program execution, 2 MB user data storage, MMC card.

Successors 
The product line was discontinued in 2000 by the introduction of Nokia 9210 Communicator which introduced a wide TFT colour internal screen, 32-bit ARM9-based RISC CPU at 52 MHz, 16 MB of internal memory, enhanced web abilities and most importantly saw the operating system change to the Symbian operating system. The 9210i launched in 2002 increased the internal memory to 40 MB, video streaming and flash 5 support for the web browser.

The 9xxx Communicators introduced features which later evolved into smartphones.

Awards
The Nokia 9000 Communicator received several awards including:
GSM World Award (for innovation) at GSM World Conference 1997
Best Technological Advance by Mobile News UK
Best New Product 1997 by Business Week magazine

In popular culture 
The Nokia 9000 is used by Val Kilmer when he played Simon Templar in the 1997 remake of The Saint, and by Anthony Hopkins and Chris Rock in the action comedy Bad Company.

The phone is also  mentioned in Bret Easton Ellis' book Glamorama.

References

External links 
  More info

9000
Products introduced in 1996
Mobile phones with an integrated hardware keyboard
Mobile phones with infrared transmitter
Flip phones